John Nelson (born 1 February 1934) is a former  Australian rules footballer who played with St Kilda in the Victorian Football League (VFL).

Notes

External links 

Living people
1934 births
Australian rules footballers from South Australia
St Kilda Football Club players
Norwood Football Club players